Michael Karl Kuehlwein is an American economist. He is the George E. and Nancy O. Moss Professor of Economics at Pomona College in Claremont, California.

Early life 
Kuehlwein grew up in Delaware. He attended Swarthmore College, graduating in 1980, and then earned his doctorate from MIT in 1988. His dissertation, under Stanley Fischer, was titled "Consumption in the presence of uncertainty".

Career 
Kuehlwein began teaching at Pomona in 1987. In 2003, he became the inaugural George E. and Nancy O. Moss Professor of Economics, an endowed chair.

He teaches courses on macroeconomics. His research interests center around consumer spending and saving.

Personal life 
Kuehlwein is married and has two boys, Gregory and Duncan.

References

External links
Faculty page at Pomona College
Research website

Year of birth missing (living people)
Living people
Pomona College faculty
American economists
Massachusetts Institute of Technology alumni
Macroeconomists